The Cartvale Football Club was founded in 1892 under the name Busby Victoria and played at the same ground as the original Cartvale club. The club changed its name to Cartvale after one season. Although the club was a constant entrant to the Scottish Cup from 1892 to 1909, it only went through the qualifying rounds once, in 1897-98.  After beating Bathgate F.C. in the first round with three late goals, Cartvale lost 12–0 to Rangers F.C. in the second, in front of 2,000 spectators at Ibrox Park, seven of the goals coming in the first half.

The club was a founder member of the revived Midland Football League in 1903–04, but the league was abandoned in an unfinished state, and Cartvale only completed 8 out of the scheduled 16 matches.

References

External links
RSSSF: Scottish Cup

Defunct football clubs in Scotland
Association football clubs established in 1892
Association football clubs disestablished in 1909
1892 establishments in Scotland
1909 disestablishments in Scotland
Football in Renfrewshire